Kitab (kitāb), also transcribed kitaab, is the Arabic, Turkic, Urdu, Hindi and in various Indian Languages word for "book". 

 Kitaab, a 1977 Hindi language movie
 Kithaab (also written Kitab), a 2018 Malayalam language play
 Kitab, the Russian name for Kitob, a city in Uzbekistan

See also 
 K-T-B, a Semitic word triconsonantal root
 Khitab, a town in northwestern Syria
 Kitab-Verlag, a publishing house in Klagenfurt, Austria
 Mus'haf, or kitāb